Roots Revisited is an album by saxophonist Maceo Parker which was originally released on the Minor Music label in 1990.

Reception

The Allmusic review by Scott Yanow stated "Roots Revisited is a throwback to the 1960s soul-jazz style and Maceo Parker gives one the impression that, if called upon, he could hold his own on a bebop date".

Track listing
All compositions by Maceo Parker except where noted
 "Them That Got" (Ray Charles) – 3:57
 "Children's World" – 10:49
 "Better Get Hit In Yo' Soul" (Charles Mingus) – 5:41
 "People Get Ready" (Curtis Mayfield) – 5:55
 "Up and Down East Street (for Ulysée Hardy)" – 8:11
 "Over the Rainbow" (Harold Arlen, Yip Harburg) – 4:14
 "Jumpin' the Blues" (Jay McShann, Charlie Parker, Walter Brown) – 6:17
 "In Time" (Sylvester Stewart) – 5:30
 "Them That Got" [Alternative version] (Charles) – 3:57 Additional track on CD release
 "Funky Christmas" (Johnny Marks) – 10:09 Additional track on CD release

Personnel
Maceo Parker – alto saxophone, piano, organ
Fred Wesley – trombone
Alfred "Pee Wee" Ellis – tenor saxophone
Don Pullen – organ (tracks 1-7, 9 & 10)
Rodney Jones – guitar
Bill Stewart – drums
Vince Henry – alto saxophone (track 1)
Bootsy Collins – bass guitar, guitar

References 

1990 albums
Maceo Parker albums
Verve Records albums